Redwood is an unincorporated community and census-designated place (CDP) in Guadalupe County, Texas, United States. The population was 4,003 at the 2020 census, down from 4,338 at the 2010 census. It is part of the San Antonio Metropolitan Statistical Area.

Geography
Redwood is located in the northeast corner of Guadalupe County at  (29.814750, -97.913375). It is bordered to the north by Hays County and the city of San Marcos. Texas State Highway 123 forms the western border of Redwood; the highway leads north  into San Marcos and south  to Seguin, the Guadalupe County seat.

Demographics

As of the 2020 United States census, there were 4,003 people, 1,026 households, and 733 families residing in the CDP.

As of the census of 2000, there were 3,586 people, 901 households, and 785 families residing in the CDP. The population density was 610.6 people per square mile (235.9/km2). There were 946 housing units at an average density of 161.1/sq mi (62.2/km2). The racial makeup of the CDP was 48.13% White, 1.53% African American, 0.89% Native American, 0.11% Asian, 0.03% Pacific Islander, 44.73% from other races, and 4.57% from two or more races. Hispanic or Latino of any race were 84.16% of the population.

There were 901 households, out of which 58.7% had children under the age of 18 living with them, 63.9% were married couples living together, 13.4% had a female householder with no husband present, and 12.8% were non-families. 7.9% of all households were made up of individuals, and 2.1% had someone living alone who was 65 years of age or older. The average household size was 3.98 and the average family size was 4.16.

In the CDP, the population was spread out, with 39.1% under the age of 18, 11.2% from 18 to 24, 32.5% from 25 to 44, 14.2% from 45 to 64, and 2.9% who were 65 years of age or older. The median age was 25 years. For every 100 females, there were 110.4 males. For every 100 females age 18 and over, there were 107.3 males.

The median income for a household in the CDP was $30,132, and the median income for a family was $31,559. Males had a median income of $20,918 versus $14,816 for females. The per capita income for the CDP was $8,525. About 16.6% of families and 18.5% of the population were below the poverty line, including 20.9% of those under age 18 and none of those age 65 or over.

References

Unincorporated communities in Guadalupe County, Texas
Unincorporated communities in Texas
Census-designated places in Guadalupe County, Texas
Census-designated places in Texas
Greater San Antonio